Kuroshioturris putere is an extinct species of sea snail, a marine gastropod mollusk in the family Turridae, the turrids.

Description
The holotype measures 13.7 mm, its diameter 6.3 mm.

Distribution
Fossils of this extinct marine species were found in New Zealand.

References

External links
 Beu, A. G. "Marine Mollusca of isotope stages of the last 2 million years in New Zealand. Part 4. Gastropoda (Ptenoglossa, Neogastropoda, Heterobranchia)." Journal of the Royal Society of New Zealand 41.1 (2011): 1-153.

putere
Gastropods described in 1927
Gastropods of New Zealand